Yugambeh–Bundjalung, also known as Bandjalangic, is a branch of the Pama–Nyungan language family, that is spoken in north-eastern New South Wales and South-East Queensland.

Yugambeh–Bundjalung was historically a dialect continuum consisting of a number of varieties, including Yugambeh, Nganduwal, Minjangbal, Njangbal (Nyangbal), Biriin, Baryulgil, Waalubal, Dinggabal, Wiyabal, Gidabal, Galibal, and Wudjeebal. Language varieties in the group vary in degree of mutual intelligibility, with varieties at different ends of the continuum being mostly unintelligible. These dialects formed four clusters:
 Tweed-Albert Language (Yugambeh) 
 Condamine-Upper Clarence (Githabul)
 Lower Richmond (Eastern Bundjalung – Nyangbal, Minyangbal and Bandjalang proper)
 Middle Clarence (Western Bundjalung)
Bowern (2011) lists Yugambeh, Githabul, Minyangbal, and Bandjalang as separate Bandjalangic languages. All Yugambeh–Bundjalung languages are nearly extinct. Bandjalang proper has the greatest number of speakers: 113, while the other dialects have a total of 26 speakers.

Gowar (Guwar) and Pimpama may be related to the Bandjalangic languages rather than to Durubalic.

Nomenclature 
The Yugambeh-Bundjalung language chain is spoken by numerous social/cultural groups some of whom have historically preferred to identify with their particular dialect name, e.g. Githabul, Yugambeh, especially as some groups do not see particular varieties as being 'the same language'.

W. E. Smythe, a doctor in Casino, knew the Bundjalung quite well noting in his time the language was spoken widely. He compiled a grammar of the Casino dialect in the 1940s, mistakenly believing he was writing a grammar for the whole language group.  When speaking of the name of language he noted:

'For the linguistic group as a whole I have used the term 'Bandjalang', with which some may disagree. Among the people themselves there is a good deal of confusion. Some say the tribal name should be 'Beigal[Baygal]' (man, people), others that there never was any collective name, while others again state that 'Bandjalang', besides being the specific name of one of the local groups, was also in use as a covering term for alI. For convenience I am doing the same.'

Adding to the confusion is the use of multiple names by different groups, i.e. what one group calls another may not be what it calls itself, or the name of a dialect may change, e.g. Terry Crowley was originally told Wehlubal for the Baryulgil dialect, while a later researcher was given Wirribi.

The earliest sources of anthropological work dated from the mid to late 1800s does not give a name for the entire language chain; however, it is clear from sources that particular writers were aware of it, in most instances referring to it by their local variety name or with a descriptor like 'this language with slight variation...'. It was not until the early 1900s, with the advent of Aboriginal Protection Boards, that non-Indigenous sources begin overtly naming wider language groups; this, however, was at a detriment to local dialect and clan names that were subsumed under the board's chosen name; Yugambeh-Bundjalung's position on the QLD-NSW border led to two standard terms Yugambeh/Yugumbir on the Queensland side and Bundjalung/Bandjalang on the New South Wales side. It was for this reason that Margaret Sharpe named the chain Yugambeh-Bundjalung, the terms being the most northerly and southerly respectively as well.

Modern Yugambeh-Bundjalung-speaking peoples are often aware of and use the overarching terms Yugambeh and Bundjalung, some groups in conjunction with their own name e.g. Byron Bay Bundjalung – Arakwal. As these words also refer to individual dialects some groups object to their usage, Crowley and Sharpe both agree that Yugambeh referred to the Beaudesert dialect, also known by the clan name Mununjali, and Bundjalung originally referred to the Bungawalbin Creek/Coraki dialect, though the Tabulam people claim they are the original Bundjalung, and use Bandjalang in opposition.

Geographic distribution 
Yugambeh-Bandjalang is spoken over a wide geographic area; the Pacific Ocean to the east and  the Logan River catchment as the northern boundary, the Clarence River forming the south and south-western boundaries, and the Northern Tablelands marking the western boundary.

Many of the dialects and branches are confined by natural features such as river basins, mountain ranges and dense bushland.

Dialects 
Yugambeh-Bundjalung or just Bundjalung is used as a cover term for the dialect chain as well as to refer to certain individual dialects. At the time of the first European settlement in the mid-1800s, the Yugambeh-Bundjalung peoples on the north coast of New South Wales and southeast of Queensland spoke up to twenty related dialects. Today only about nine remain. All were mutually intelligible with neighbouring dialects. The dialects form recognisable clusters that share phonological and morphological features, as well as having higher degrees of mutual intelligibility.

Clusters

Dialects

Condamine – Upper Clarence

Middle Clarence

Lower Richmond

Tweed–Albert

Dialectal differences 
Until the 1970s all language and linguist work to date had been undertaken on individual varieties, with major grammar work undertaken on Githabul, Minyangbal, Yugambeh, and the Casino dialect. Terry Crowley was the first to publish a study of the wider Bandjalangic language group,  titled 'The middle Clarence dialects of Bandjalang', it included previously unpublished research on the Casino dialect as an appendix. Crowley analysed not only the vocabulary but grammar of the varieties including comparative cognate figures and examples from various dialects.

Phonology

Vowel 
Varieties of Yugambeh-Bundjalung may have a vowel system of either three or four vowels that also contrast in length, resulting in either six or eight phonemic vowels in total.

In practical orthography and some descriptions of the language, the letter "h" is often used after the vowel to indicate a long vowel.

Vowel alternations

The low central vowel  can be fronted and raised following a palatal consonant, and backed following a velar consonant.

Unstressed short vowels can be reduced to the neutral central vowel schwa in a similar way to English.

Consonants 
Yugambeh-Bundjalung has a smaller inventory of consonant phonemes than is typical of most Australian languages, having only four contrastive places of articulation and only one lateral and one rhotic phoneme.

Obstruents

Although the standard IPA symbols used in transcription of the language are the voiced stop symbols, these segments are better characterised as obstruents because they are realised more often as fricatives or affricates than actual stops. There is no contrast in Yugambeh-Bundjalung between these manners of articulation.

Yugambeh-Bundjalung varieties do not have voicing contrasts for their obstruent sequences, and so phonological literature varies in its representation of these consonants- some linguists have chosen the symbols /p/, /k/, /c/, /t/, and others have decided upon /b/, /g/, //, /d/. Generally, these consonants are phonetically voiceless, except when following a homorganic nasal segment.

Nasals

When nasal stops occur syllable-finally, they are often produced with a stop onset as a free variant.

Lateral

The lateral phoneme can appear as a flap rather than an approximant, and sometimes occurs prestopped as a free variant in the same way as nasals.

Rhotic

The rhotic phoneme has several surface realisations in Yugambeh-Bundjalung. Between vowels, it tends to be a flap, although it can sometimes be an approximant, and it is usually a trill at the end of syllables.

Semi-vowels

The existence of semi-vowels in Yugambeh-Bundjalung can be disputed, as in many Australian languages. Some linguists posit their existence in order to avoid an analysis that involves onset-less syllables, which are usually held to be non-existent in Australian languages. Some phonologists have found that semi-vowels can be replaced with glottal stops in some varieties of Yugambeh-Bundjalung.

Stress 

Yugambeh-Bundjalung is a stress-timed language and is quantity-sensitive, with stress being assigned to syllables with long vowels. Short unstressed vowels tend to be reduced to the neutral vowel schwa.

Syllable structure 

Like many Australian languages, Yugambeh-Bundjalung is thought to have a constraint that states that all syllables must have a consonant onset. Only vowels are permitted as the syllable nucleus, and these may be long or short. Syllable codas are also permitted, with long or short vowels in the nucleus. However, long vowels are not permitted to occur in adjacent syllables.

Phonotactics 

Consonant clusters

Yugambeh-Bundjalung does not permit clusters of the same consonant, or clusters that begin with an obstruent phoneme or end with an approximant, except the labio-velar glide. All homorganic nasal-obstruent clusters occur in the language. Clusters usually only involve two segments, but clusters of three may occur if an intervening vowel is deleted by some process.

Vocabulary 

Cognate comparison between the most southern and northern dialects, Bandjalang (Proper) and Yugambeh (Proper), shows 52% similarity. Cognate similarity is highest between dialects within branches, typically being ~80%, these percentages are even higher amongst the Tweed-Albert dialects at ~90%. Between branches of the family this rate falls to ~60–70% between neighbouring clusters.

Isogloss 
Some vocabulary differences in common vocabulary are present: 

(Both were used in the centrally located Lismore dialect).

The difference in words for men is significant as groups often use it for identification as well as a language name (Mibinah = language lit. 'of man', Baygalnah = language lit. 'of man').

Vowel shifts 
A north to south shift of /a/ to /e/ (with an intermittent /i/ present in some varieties) in some common vocabulary.

 'Who': //
 'You': //

A north to south shift of /i/ to /a/ (with an intermittent/e/ present in some varieties) occurring on the demonstrative set.

 'This': //
 'That': //

A shift of /a/ to /u/ in the Tweed-Albert dialects.

 'No': /
 'Vegetable': /

Grammar 
Crowley's research found a number of grammar differences between the varieties and clusters. Further research by Dr. Margaret Sharpe detailed these finer differences.

Noun declensions 
All varieties within the family use suffixes to decline nouns. Most are universal; however, there are a few poignant differences. A complex system exists whereby suffixes are categorised into orders, with the order and use governed by universal rules.

Locative 
A past and non-past form of the locative exists in Githabul, Yugambeh and Minyangbal.

Abessive 
The abessive  is present in Yugambeh and Githabul, being used on nouns and verbs (use on verbs does not occur further south).

Gender 
A system of marking four grammatical genders (two animate – human and animal, and two inanimate – arboreal and neuter) with the use of suffixes is present in three of the clusters. The morphological forms and usage of these gender suffixes vary between the clusters, with some dialects marking both demonstratives and adjectives, others marking solely adjectives.

Verbal morphology 
The extensive use of suffixes extends to verbs as well; the suffix system is the same throughout the language group with a few minor differences.

The imminent aspect (used in other varieties for most instances that use the English future tense) has shifted in the Tweed-Albert Language to an irrealis mode, now denoting the potential mood, while the continuous aspect in conjunction with a time word is now used for future tense situations.

Example of differences in -hny suffix usage:

 Wiyabal

 Yugambeh (Proper)

 Yugambeh (Proper)

The purposive suffix is -yah in the Tweed-Albert and Condamine-Upper Clarence languages, while it is -gu in the other two branches.

 Yugambeh (Proper)

 Wahlubal

Vocabulary

See also

 Bundjalung people
 Bundjalung Nation Timeline
 Dirawong
 List of Aboriginal languages of New South Wales

References
Notes

Bibliography

External links 
 Bibliography of Bundjalung language and people resources, at the Australian Institute of Aboriginal and Torres Strait Islander Studies
 Bibliography of Arakwal language and people resources, at the Australian Institute of Aboriginal and Torres Strait Islander Studies

 
Bundjalung people
Endangered indigenous Australian languages in New South Wales
Severely endangered languages